Manuel Arvide (1897–1969) was a Mexican film actor.

Selected filmography
 Heads or Tails (1937)
 Another Dawn (1943)
 El Ametralladora (1943)
 The Escape (1944)
 Adultery (1945)
 Twilight (1945)
 Madman and Vagabond (1946)
 Honeymoon (1947)
 Five Faces of Woman (1947)
 Gangster's Kingdom (1948)
 What Has That Woman Done to You? (1951)
 In the Palm of Your Hand (1951)
 Soledad's Shawl (1952)
 The White Rose (1954)
 Tehuantepec (1954)
 When I Leave (1954)
 Here Are the Aguilares! (1957)
 The White Sister (1960)

References

Bibliography 
 Hardy, Phil. The BFI Companion to Crime. A&C Black, 1997.

External links 
 

1897 births
1969 deaths
Mexican male film actors
Mexican male silent film actors
male actors from Mexico City